Oh! What a Nurse! is a 1926 American silent comedy film directed by Charles Reisner and written by Darryl F. Zanuck. The film stars Sydney Chaplin, Patsy Ruth Miller, Gayne Whitman, Matthew Betz, Edith Yorke, and David Torrence. The film was released by Warner Bros. on March 7, 1926.

Cast

Box office
According to Warner Bros records the film earned $370,000 domestically and $69,000 foreign.

References

External links

 

1926 films
1920s English-language films
Silent American comedy films
Warner Bros. films
Films directed by Charles Reisner
American silent feature films
American black-and-white films
1926 comedy films
1920s American films